Caamembeca is a genus of flowering plants belonging to the family Polygalaceae.

Its native range is Southern America.

Species:

Caamembeca amazonensis 
Caamembeca autranii 
Caamembeca formosa 
Caamembeca gigantea 
Caamembeca grandifolia 
Caamembeca insignis 
Caamembeca martinellii 
Caamembeca oleifolia 
Caamembeca oxyphylla 
Caamembeca salicifolia 
Caamembeca spectabilis 
Caamembeca ulei 
Caamembeca warmingiana

References

Polygalaceae
Fabales genera